Casey may refer to:

Places

Antarctica
Casey Station
Casey Range

Australia
 Casey, Australian Capital Territory
 City of Casey, Melbourne
 Division of Casey, electoral district for the House of Representatives

Canada
 Casey, Ontario
 Casey, Quebec, a village - see Casey Emergency Airstrip

United States
 Casey, Illinois, a city in Clark County
 Casey, Iowa
 Casey County, Kentucky
 Casey, Wisconsin

People and fictional characters
 Casey (given name)
 Casey (surname)

Other uses 
 "Casey" (song), a 2008 song by Darren Hayes
 Casey (typeface), a sans-serif typeface developed by the Kowloon-Canton Railway Corporation for use in its railway system
 Casey, the Japanese name for Abra, one of the fictional species of Pokémon
 Planned Parenthood v. Casey, 1992 U.S. Supreme Court decision that upheld limited abortion rights
 Casey's, a general store chain
 Casey (band), hardcore punk from South Wales

See also 
 
 
Case (name)
Cayce (disambiguation)
Keysi
O'Casey (surname)
CACI, a multinational professional services and information technology company
KC (disambiguation)